1987 in sports describes the year's events in world sport.

Alpine skiing
 Alpine Skiing World Cup
 Men's overall season champion: Pirmin Zurbriggen, Switzerland
 Women's overall season champion: Maria Walliser, Switzerland

American football
 Super Bowl XXI – the New York Giants (NFC) won 39–20 over the Denver Broncos (AFC)
Location: Rose Bowl
Attendance: 101,063
MVP: Phil Simms, QB (New York)
 January 2 – Fiesta Bowl (1986 season):
 The Penn State Nittany Lions won 14-10 over the Miami Hurricanes to win the national championship
 Arena football has its demonstration season—its first season— played with four teams.
February 25 – The Southern Methodist University Mustangs football team becomes the first college football program to be given the death penalty by the NCAA Committee on Rules Infractions

Artistic gymnastics
 World Artistic Gymnastics Championships –
 Men's all-around champion: Dmitry Bilozerchev, USSR
 Women's all-around champion: Aurelia Dobre, Romania
 Men's team competition champion: USSR
 Women's team competition champion: Romania

Association football
 FA Cup final – Coventry City defeated Tottenham Hotspur 3-2
 Automatic relegation is introduced from the Football League, with Lincoln City F.C. relegated

Australian rules football
 Victorian Football League
 The West Coast Eagles and the Brisbane Bears join the league.
 Carlton wins the 91st VFL Premiership (Carlton 15.14 (104) d Hawthorn 9.17 (71))
 Brownlow Medal awarded to Tony Lockett (St Kilda) and John Platten (Hawthorn)

Athletics
 August–September – 1987 World Championships in Athletics held in Rome

Baseball
 January 14 – Catfish Hunter and Billy Williams are elected to the Baseball Hall of Fame. Hunter made his name as the ace of the Oakland A's staff in their championship years and made his fortune as one of the first free agents. Williams set a National League record by playing in 1,117 consecutive games and accumulating 426 home runs and a batting title.
 August 3 – Minnesota Twins pitcher Joe Niekro is suspended for 10 days for possessing a nail file on the pitcher's mound. Niekro claimed he had been filing his nails in the dugout and put the file in his back pocket when the inning started.
 World Series – Minnesota Twins won 4 games to 3 over the St. Louis Cardinals. The Series MVP was  Frank Viola, Minnesota
 Lowest regular-season record of any World Series champion (85-77, .525) until 2006 (Cardinals 83-78, .516)
 First World Series game played indoors (Game 1 at the Hubert H. Humphrey Metrodome)
 First World Series where the home team won every game

Basketball
 NCAA Men's Basketball Championship –
 Indiana won 74-73 over Syracuse
 NBA Finals –
 Los Angeles Lakers won 4 games to 2 over the Boston Celtics
 National Basketball League (Australia) Finals:
 Brisbane Bullets defeated the Perth Wildcats 2-0 in the best-of-three final series.

Boxing
 March 7 in Las Vegas, Nevada, Mike Tyson adds the WBA heavyweight title to his WBC belt  when he beats James Smith in a 12-round decision.
 April 6 – Sugar Ray Leonard beats Marvin Hagler for boxing's world Middleweight championship.

Canadian football
 Grey Cup – Edmonton Eskimos won 38–36 over the Toronto Argonauts
 Vanier Cup – McGill Redmen won 47–11 over the UBC Thunderbirds

Cricket
 1987 Cricket World Cup – Final: Australia beat England by 7 runs

Cycling
 Giro d'Italia won by Stephen Roche of Ireland
 Tour de France – Stephen Roche of Ireland
 UCI Road World Championships – Men's road race – Stephen Roche of Ireland

Dogsled racing
 Iditarod Trail Sled Dog Race Champion –
 Susan Butcher won with lead dogs: Granite & Mattie

Field hockey
 Men's Champions Trophy won by West Germany
 Women's Champions Trophy won by the Netherlands
 Men's European Nations Cup won by the Netherlands
 Women's European Nations Cup won by the Netherlands

Figure skating
 World Figure Skating Championship –
 Men's champion: Brian Orser, Canada
 Ladies' champion: Katarina Witt, Germany
 Pair skating champions: Ekaterina Gordeeva / Sergei Grinkov, Soviet Union
 Ice dancing champions: Natalia Bestemianova / Andrei Bukin, Soviet Union

Gaelic Athletic Association
 Camogie
 All-Ireland Camogie Champion: Kilkenny
 National Camogie League: Kilkenny
 Gaelic football
 All-Ireland Senior Football Championship – Meath 1-14 died Cork 0-11
 National Football League – Dublin 1-11 died Kerry 0-11
 Ladies' Gaelic football
 All-Ireland Senior Football Champion: Kerry
 National Football League: Kerry
 Hurling
 All-Ireland Senior Hurling Championship – Galway 1-12 died Kilkenny 0-9
 National Hurling League – Galway 3–12 beat Clare 3–10

Golf
Men's professional
 Masters Tournament – Larry Mize
 U.S. Open – Scott Simpson
 British Open – Nick Faldo
 PGA Championship – Larry Nelson
 PGA Tour money leader – Curtis Strange – $925,941
 Senior PGA Tour money leader – Chi Chi Rodriguez – $509,145
 Ryder Cup – Europe won 15-13 over the United States in team golf.
Men's amateur
 British Amateur – Paul Mayo
 U.S. Amateur – Billy Mayfair
Women's professional
 Nabisco Dinah Shore – Betsy King
 LPGA Championship – Jane Geddes
 U.S. Women's Open – Laura Davies
 Classique du Maurier Classic – Jody Rosenthal
 LPGA Tour money leader – Ayako Okamoto – $466,034

Harness racing
 The North America Cup – Runnymede Lobell
 United States Pacing Triple Crown races –
 – Cane Pace – Righteous Bucks
 – Little Brown Jug – Jaguar Spur
 – Messenger Stakes – Redskin
 United States Trotting Triple Crown races –
 – Hambletonian – Mack Lobell
 – Yonkers Trot – Mack Lobell
 – Kentucky Futurity – Napoletano
 Australian Inter Dominion Harness Racing Championship –
 Pacers: Lightning Blue
 Trotters: Tussle

Horse racing
Steeplechases
 Cheltenham Gold Cup – The Thinker
 Grand National – Maori Venture
Flat races
 Australia – Melbourne Cup won by Kensei
 Canada – Queen's Plate won by Market Control
 France – Prix de l'Arc de Triomphe won by Trempolino
 Ireland – Irish Derby Stakes won by Sir Harry Lewis
 Japan – Japan Cup won by Le Glorieux
 English Triple Crown Races:
 2,000 Guineas Stakes – Don't Forget Me
 The Derby – Reference Point
 St. Leger Stakes – Reference Point
 United States Triple Crown Races:
 Kentucky Derby – Alysheba
 Preakness Stakes – Alysheba
 Belmont Stakes – Bet Twice
 Breeders' Cup World Thoroughbred Championships:
 Breeders' Cup Classic – Ferdinand
 Breeders' Cup Distaff – Sacahuista
 Breeders' Cup Juvenile – Success Express
 Breeders' Cup Juvenile Fillies – Epitome
 Breeders' Cup Mile – Miesque
 Breeders' Cup Sprint – Very Subtle
 Breeders' Cup Turf – Theatrical

Ice hockey
 Art Ross Trophy as the NHL's leading scorer during the regular season: Wayne Gretzky, Edmonton Oilers
 Hart Memorial Trophy for the NHL's Most Valuable Player: Wayne Gretzky, Edmonton Oilers
 Stanley Cup – Edmonton Oilers won 4 games to 3 over the Philadelphia Flyers
 World Hockey Championship –
 Men's champion: Sweden defeated the Soviet Union
 Junior Men's champion: Finland defeated Czechoslovakia after a bench clearing brawl occurred between Canada and the Soviet Union

Lacrosse
 Inaugural season of the Eagle Pro Box Lacrosse League (later the National Lacrosse League)
 Championship won by the Baltimore Thunder

Motorsport

Rugby league
1987 National Panasonic Cup
1987 NSWRL season
1987 New Zealand rugby league season
1986–87 Rugby Football League season / 1987–88 Rugby Football League season
1987 State of Origin series
1987 World Club Challenge
1985–1988 Rugby League World Cup

Rugby union
 93rd Five Nations Championship series is won by France who complete the Grand Slam
 Inaugural Rugby Union World Cup is held in Australia and New Zealand.  The winners are New Zealand.

Snooker
 World Snooker Championship – Steve Davis beats Joe Johnson 18-14
 World rankings – Steve Davis remains world number one for 1987/88

Swimming
 Tenth Pan American Games held in Indianapolis, United States (August 9 – August 15)
 Second Pan Pacific Championships held in Brisbane, Australia (August 13 – August 16)
 August 13 – Tom Jager regains the world record from fellow American Matt Biondi (22.33) in the 50m freestyle (long course) at the 1987 Pan Pacific Swimming Championships in Brisbane, Australia, clocking 22.32.

Taekwondo
 World Championships held in Barcelona, Spain

Tennis
 Grand Slam in tennis men's results:
 – Australian Open – Stefan Edberg
 – French Open – Ivan Lendl
 – Wimbledon championships – Pat Cash
 – U.S. Open – Ivan Lendl
 Grand Slam in tennis women's results:
 – Australian Open – Hana Mandlíková
 – French Open – Steffi Graf
 – Wimbledon championships – Martina Navratilova
 – U.S. Open – Martina Navratilova
 Davis Cup
 Sweden defeats India (5-0) in the final

Volleyball
 Asia Volleyball Championships won by Japan (men) and China (women)
 European Volleyball Championships in Ghent, Belgium won by USSR (men) and DDR (women)
 Pan American Games Volleyball in Indianapolis won by USA (men) and Cuba (women)

Water polo
 Men's World Cup held in Thesaloniki won by Yugoslavia
 Men's event at Pan American Games held in Indianapolis won by USA
 Men's European Championship held in Strasbourg won by USSR
 Women's European Championship held in Strasbourg won by the Netherlands

Yacht racing
 The America's Cup returns to the United States as challenger Stars & Stripes 87, of the San Diego Yacht Club, beats Australian defender Kookaburra III, from the Royal Perth Yacht Club, 4 races to 0.

Multi-sport events
 Tenth Pan American Games held in Indianapolis, United States
 Fourth All-Africa Games held in Nairobi, Kenya
 Tenth Mediterranean Games held in Latakia, Syria
 Fourteenth Summer Universiade held in Zagreb, Yugoslavia
 Thirteenth Winter Universiade held in Štrbské Pleso, Czechoslovakia

Awards
 Associated Press Male Athlete of the Year – Ben Johnson, Track and field
 Associated Press Female Athlete of the Year – Jackie Joyner-Kersee, Track and field

References

 
Sports by year